Glycosmis parviflora is a species of flowering plant in the family Rutaceae, known commonly as Chinese glycosmis and Jamaican Mandarin-orange. It occurs in China, Japan, Taiwan, Myanmar and Vietnam. It is widely naturalized in the tropics including in the West Indies. In temperate zones, it can be cultivated indoors as a houseplant.

References

parviflora
Edible fruits